Fast Sulphon Black F is a complexometric indicator used with EDTA, almost exclusively used in copper complexation determination.

Application
Fast Sulphon Black is purple when complexed with copper, and turns green when titrated against EDTA,  as the EDTA displaces it, being the better complexing agent due to the chelate effect.

References

Handbook of copper compounds and applications by H. Wayne Richardson (1997)

Complexometric indicators
Naphthalenesulfonic acids
1-Naphthols
2-Naphthols